
Griessee is a lake in Valais, Switzerland. The reservoir is located in the municipality of Ulrichen and can be reached by road from Nufenen Pass. The lake is fed by the Gries Glacier.

The gravity dam Gries was built in 1965.

See also
List of lakes of Switzerland
List of mountain lakes of Switzerland

References

External links

Lakes of Valais
Reservoirs in Switzerland